Yerim Seowon is a former seowon in Miryang, Gyeongsangnam-do.  It is located in Bubuk-myeon on the slopes of Jongnamsan, in the valley of the Miryang River.

The Yerim Seowon was built in 1567 by Yi Do-u to enshrine Kim Jong-jik, a Confucian scholar and politician who was native to Miryang.  At that time it bore the name "Deokseong Seowon."  Destroyed during Hideyoshi's invasions of Korea in the 1590s, it was rebuilt in 1606.  In 1669 it received a royal warrant.

The seowon, like most of those across Korea, was closed by order of the regent Daewon-gun in 1871.  However, beginning in 1874 local scholars once again began to gather there, although it no longer served as a school.  It continues in use as a shrine today, and was designated a tangible cultural treasure of Gyeongsangnam-do in 1974.

External links
Naver Encyclopedia entry 
Asian Historical Architecture: Yerim Seowon

Seowon
Miryang
Buildings and structures in South Gyeongsang Province